Pseudocorchorus is a genus of flowering plants belonging to the family Malvaceae.

Its native range is Madagascar.

Species:

Pseudocorchorus alatus 
Pseudocorchorus cornutus 
Pseudocorchorus greveanus 
Pseudocorchorus mamillatus 
Pseudocorchorus pusillus 
Pseudocorchorus rostratus

References

Grewioideae
Malvaceae genera
Taxa named by René Paul Raymond Capuron